Syncretism or the Mixed School in Chinese philosophy is an eclectic school of thought that combined elements of Confucianism, Taoism, Mohism, and Legalism. The Syncretist texts include the Huainanzi, Lüshi Chunqiu, and the Shizi. The (c. 330 BCE) Shizi is the earliest of the Syncretist texts.

References

Chinese philosophy
Confucianism
Taoist schools
Mohism
Schools and traditions in ancient Chinese philosophy
Syncretism